Dmitri Pavlovich Matrin (1891 in Moscow – 1958) was an association football player.

International career
Matrin made his debut for Russia on 14 July 1912 in a friendly against Hungary. He allowed 12 goals in a 0–12 loss, but was called up again for the team the next year.

See also
Aleksei Karakosov

External links
 Profile 

1891 births
1958 deaths
Russian footballers
Russia international footballers

Association football goalkeepers